Aminata Sana Congo (born 1974) is a Burkina Faso politician and diplomat. She was a Minister of Development of the Digital Economy and the Posts from January 2016 to February 2017. She was appointed Ambassador to Taiwan in August 2017.

Career
Sana is a computer scientist and worked at the General Delegation of Informatics. In 2010, she joined the Pan African Forum as Director of Organization and Communication. In 2013, she became Director of training and promotion in ICT.

On 12 January 2016, Sana was appointed Minister of Development of the Digital Economy and the Posts by Prime Minister Paul Kaba Thieba. She resigned in February 2017 amid controversy over Huawei tablets given to parliament.

On 14 August 2017, Sana was appointed as Burkina Faso's ambassador to Taiwan by President Roch Marc Christian Kaboré.

Personal life
Sana is married to Aminata Congo and has two children.

References

Living people
1974 births
Women government ministers of Burkina Faso
Government ministers of Burkina Faso
Burkinabé women ambassadors
Ambassadors of Burkina Faso to Taiwan
21st-century Burkinabé people